Negrera is used a synonym for several wine grapes including:

Negrara
Juan García
Malbec